Arbona may refer to:
 Arbona, Basque name of Arbonne, France
 Arbona, alternate name of Abnoba, hills in Germany